Kaarbø is a Norwegian surname. Notable people with the surname include:

Ragnhild Kaarbø (1889–1949), Norwegian painter
Rikard Kaarbø (1850–1901), Norwegian businessperson and politician

Norwegian-language surnames